"A Minute and a Half" is a song recorded by Canadian country music artist Chris Cummings. It was released in 1998 as the second single from his extended play The Kind of Heart That Breaks and was also included on his American debut album Chris Cummings. It peaked at number 9 on the RPM Country Tracks chart in August 1998.

Chart performance

Year-end charts

References

1997 songs
1998 singles
Chris Cummings songs
Warner Music Group singles
Song recordings produced by Jim Ed Norman
Songs written by Chris Cummings